Alfred Hopkins (16 May 1900 – 16 April 1986) was a British weightlifter. He competed in the men's featherweight event at the 1928 Summer Olympics.

References

1900 births
1986 deaths
British male weightlifters
Olympic weightlifters of Great Britain
Weightlifters at the 1928 Summer Olympics
People from West Ham